Vendémiaire Pavot (30 September 1883 – 18 December 1929) was a French sculptor.

Main works

La Faunesse

This 1913 work can be seen in the Valenciennes Jardin de la Rhônelle.

Edmond Mambré medallion

This medallion depicts the Valenciennes musician and dates to 1912.   It can be seen in 13, rue Notre-Dame, Valenciennes.

The façade of Albert's l'hôtel de ville

The Albert hôtel de ville was built in the "Flemish" style with art déco influences and was designed by architects Alexandre Miniac and Benjamin Maneval.
The building was inaugurated in 1932. Pavot created a moulded cement frieze for the front of the building with 12 panels depicting workers in the fields, industrial scenes and scenes showing a young father going off to war and returning to his family at the end of the war. Albert had been in the thick of fighting throughout the 1914–1918 war.

References

1883 births
1929 deaths
20th-century French sculptors
French male sculptors
People from Valenciennes